The Ruwallah (singular Ruweili/Ruwaili) are a large Arab tribe of northern Arabia and the Syrian Desert, including modern-day Jordan.

History
Until the demarcation of borders in the Middle East in the early 20th century, the Ruwallah were an almost entirely warrior tribe centered in the region of al-Jauf and Wadi al-Sirhan Sirhan Valley in northern Arabia, though their tribal territories extended as far southwards as al-Qasim, and as far northwards as Damascus. The tribe apparently came to being sometime in the 16th century, or shortly thereafter, and belongs to the Dhana Maslam branch of the large 'Anizzah tribal confederation. They were active in the "Arab Revolt" during the reign of Nuri al-Shaalan against the Ottomans during the First World War. The leadership of the tribe is with the house of Sha'lan (or the Al Sha'lan), who in recent decades have had close ties with the Lebanese Government and Saudi royal family. Most of the tribe's members have settled into sedentary or urban life in Saudi Arabia, Jordan, and Syria.

Branches
The Ruwallah tribe mostly consists of five major branches:
 Al-Kwakbah – singular (Kwikbi)
 Al-Doughman – singular (Doughmani)
 Al-Murre 'eth – singular (Murr 'ethee)
 Al-Frrejah – singular (Frreeji)
 Al-Ga' 'a' 'gaah – singular (Ga 'ee'ga'ae)
 Al-Alrahmoun

References

Sources

Further reading
Musil, Alois,  1928,  The Manners and Customs of the Rwala Bedouins
Lancaster, William,  1981,  The Rwala Bedouin Today (Changing Cultures series)  Cambridge University Press
Michael E. Meeker, 1979, Literature and Violence in Northern Arabia Cambridge: Cambridge University Press.

See also
 'Anizzah
 Bani Sakhr
 Majali

Tribes of Arabia
Tribes of Saudi Arabia
Tribes of Syria
Wadi Sirhan